Eucalyptus yilgarnensis,  commonly known as yorrell or yorrel, is a species of mallee, rarely a small tree, that is endemic to Western Australia. It usually has rough bark on the trunk, smooth bark above, linear to narrow elliptical or narrow lance-shaped adult leaves, flower buds in groups of seven or nine, white flowers and barrel-shaped fruit.

Description
It usually has rough, fibrous brown bark, smooth grey to brown bark above, sometimes smooth bark throughout. Flowering occurs from April to November and the flowers are white.

Taxonomy and naming
Yorrell was first formally described in 1919 by Joseph Maiden who published the description in Journal and Proceedings of New South Wales and gave it the name Eucalyptus gracilis var. yilgarnensis.<ref name=APNI1>{{cite web|title=Eucalyptus gracilis var. yilgarnensis|url= https://id.biodiversity.org.au/instance/apni/455069 |publisher=APNI|access-date=25 January 2020}}</ref> In 1986, Ian Brooker raised the variety to species status as E. yilgarnensis.

Distribution and habitatEucalyptus yilgarnensis grows on sandy soil in low, open woodland between Wongan Hills, Kalgoorlie, Zanthus, Balladonia and Salmon Gums.
  
Associated species in the woodland overstorey include E. salubris and E. salmonophloia and sometimes E. melanoxylon and E. oleosa. Plants found in the understorey shrubs include Acacia colletioides, Atriplex vesicaria, A. paludosa, Melaleuca hamulosa, Regelia cymbifolia, Exocarpos aphyllus and Grevillea acuaria''.

Conservation status
This eucalypt is classified as "not threatened" by the Western Australian Government Department of Parks and Wildlife.

See also
List of Eucalyptus species

References

yilgarnensis
Endemic flora of Western Australia
Mallees (habit)
Myrtales of Australia
Eucalypts of Western Australia
Trees of Australia
Plants described in 1919
Taxa named by Ian Brooker
Taxa named by Joseph Maiden